Hellfire: A Journey from Hiroshima is a 1986 American documentary film directed by John Junkerman. It was nominated for an Academy Award for Best Documentary Feature.

References

External links

Hellfire at First Run Features

1986 films
1986 documentary films
American documentary films
Documentary films about the atomic bombings of Hiroshima and Nagasaki
1980s English-language films
1980s American films